Robert Fuller (born 21 October 1964) is  a former Australian rules footballer who played with Richmond in the Victorian Football League (VFL).

Notes

External links 
		
		
		
		
		

Living people
1964 births
Australian rules footballers from Victoria (Australia)
Richmond Football Club players